Sir William Ashhurst or Ashurst (26 April 1647 – 12 January 1720) was an English banker and Whig politician who sat in the English and British House of Commons between 1689 and 1710. He served as Lord Mayor of London for the year 1693 to 1694.

Early life
Ashurst was the son of Henry Ashurst, Merchant Taylor, of Watling Street and Hackney, Middlesex, and his wife was Judith Reresby, daughter of William Reresby, merchant, of London. He was apprenticed to his father in 1662, and became a Freeman of the Merchant Taylor's Company in 1669. He married Elizabeth Thompson, the daughter of Robert Thompson, merchant, of Newington Green, Surrey, by licence dated 31 August 1668.

Career

Ashurst became a successful woollen draper, trading with North America. In 1679 he became a Common Councillor for Bread Street Ward. On his father's death in 1680 he inherited property in Watling Street, Castle Hedingham in Essex and six other houses. He became a member and treasurer of the New England Company in 1681 and was Auditor of Bridgehouse accounts from 1682 to 1684.

Ashurst was appointed Deputy Lieutenant in 1687 and elected Alderman for Bread Street on 12 August 1687. He became Master of the Merchant Taylors Company for the year 1687 to 1688 and was knighted on 29 October 1687. In 1688, he changed wards and became Alderman for Billingsgate. He was also appointed President of Christ's Hospital in 1688. He was a good friend of Edmund Calamy and was a nonconformist like the rest of his family, so he was an active supporter of the Glorious Revolution.  In 1689 he became Colonel of the Yellow Regiment, London Trained Bands, for a year and Vice-President of the Honourable Artillery Company (HAC) from 1689 to 1703. He also became a J.P. for Middlesex, and at the 1689 English general election was returned as Whig Member of Parliament for the City of London in the Convention Parliament (1689). He was then appointed as Commissioner for preventing the export of wool from 1689 to 1692.

Ashurst was defeated when he stood for the City of London at the 1690 English general election but was elected Sheriff of London for the year 1691 to 1692. He was defeated again when he stood at a by-election for the City of London on 2 March 1693. He was chosen as Lord Mayor of London for the year 1693 to 1694.  He was Colonel of the White Regiment from 1694 to 1702.  At the 1695 English general election he was returned again as MP for the City of London and signed the Association on 27 February 1696. He became relatively active in Parliament, supporting a measure  to repair the highways of Islington and St  Pancras and he supported the attainder of Sir John Fenwick in November 1696. He became a governor of the New England Company in 1696 for the rest of his life. In  January 1697, he presented a bill in Parliament to complete the building of St  Paul's cathedral. He became a Director of the Bank of England in 1697 and served with statutory intervals until 1714. In 1697 he became a Governor of Highgate School. In July 1698, he was appointed to a lucrative post as a Commissioner for excise and was returned again as MP for the City at the 1698 English general election. He voted with the Court Whigs against the Disbanding Bill in 1698 and 1699 and for of the standing army on 18 January 1699. Place legislation was passed in 1700 which prevented Excise Commissioners from sitting in Parliament, and he resigned his place on the Commission. He was returned to Parliament again at the two general election of 1701, but was defeated at the 1702 English general election.

Ashurst was returned to Parliament again as a Whig at the 1705 English general election and voted for the Court candidate for  Speaker on 25 October 1705. He supported the Court in its proceedings on the place clause  in the regency bill on 18 February 1706 and was rewarded with a post as a commissioner for receiving the loan to the Emperor. He served on several drafting committees and was concerned with  a bill to encourage the Royal Lustring Company, He was a colonel of the White regiment again from 1707 to 1710. At the 1708 British general election he was returned again as Whig MP for City of London. He became President of the Honourable Artillery Company in 1708. In Parliament he supported the naturalization of the Palatines in  1709, and voted for the impeachment of Dr Sacheverell in 1710. He became Deputy Lieutenant again by 1710. He was defeated at the 1710 British general election. In 1714, he was re-appointed Commissioner for Excise which precluded him from standing for Parliament again. He also became Colonel of the  White regiment for the rest of his life. By 1719 he was a Governor of St Thomas' Hospital.

Later life and legacy
When in the country Ashurst lived in a Queen Anne style red-brick mansion he built in the outer bailey of Hedingham Castle after his purchase of the castle in 1693. He died on 12 January 1720, 'after a very long indisposition'. He and his wife had seven sons and four daughters of whom a son and a daughter predeceased him.

Notes

References

Further reading

1647 births
1720 deaths
Members of the Parliament of Great Britain for English constituencies
Whig (British political party) MPs for English constituencies
British MPs 1707–1708
British MPs 1708–1710
Sheriffs of the City of London
17th-century lord mayors of London
London Trained Bands officers
English MPs 1689–1690
English MPs 1695–1698
English MPs 1698–1700
English MPs 1701
English MPs 1701–1702
English MPs 1705–1707
Members of the Parliament of England for the City of London